Sport Klub Tirana, is an Albanian sports club based in the country's capital Tirana, most notable for its association football department. The club also consists of various other departments including basketball, volleyball, futsal and boxing.

Departments

Footnotes

Sport in Tirana
1920 establishments in Albania